Arsenyevsky District  (. Arsěńěvskij rajon) is an administrative district (raion), one of the twenty-three in Tula Oblast, Russia. It is located in the west of the oblast. Its administrative center is the urban locality (a work settlement) of Arsenyevo. Population: 12,209 (2010 Census);  The population of Arsenyevo accounts for 39.3% of the district's total population.

Administrative and municipal status
Within the framework of administrative divisions, Arsenyevsky District is one of the twenty-three in the oblast. The work settlement of Arsenyevo serves as its administrative center.

As a municipal division, the territory of the district is split between two municipal formations—Arsenyevsky Municipal District, to which the work settlement of Arsenyevo and 103 of the administrative district's rural localities belong, and Slavny Urban Okrug, which covers the rest of the administrative district's territory, including the urban-type settlement of Slavny.

References

Notes

Sources

Districts of Tula Oblast
